Robert Lurting was the 36th Mayor of New York City from 1726 to 1735 and the first mayor of the city to die while in office.

Lurting Avenue in the Morris Park section of The Bronx is named after him.

Mayors of New York City
1735 deaths